Kuliyeva Leyla is a public figure in Martial arts.

She was elected to Secretary-General of the Turkmenistan Martial Arts Federation in her 20s and is also a former presenter of the Turkmenistan national and international martial arts team. In 2016, Leyla Kuliyeva was awarded the title of best female Ju-Jitsu athlete in Asia. She was elected as a Chairperson of the JJAU anti-doping education committee.

References 

Turkmenistan female martial artists
Living people
Sportspeople from Ashgabat
Year of birth missing (living people)